Sofia Open may refer to:

ATP Sofia Open, an ATP 250 Series tennis tournament started in 2016.
Sofia Open (tennis), a defunct Grand Prix tennis event played from 1980 to 1981.